New Eyes is a 2014 album by Clean Bandit.

New Eyes may also refer to:

 "New Eyes", the title song of the Clean Bandit album
 "New Eyes" (Adam Lambert song), released in 2019
 "New Eyes", 1986 song by Ten Inch Men from the Hours in Pain EP
 New Eyes, annual playwriting festival at Mu Performing Arts since 1993
 "New Eyes", Season 1 episode 6 of Hacks
 New Eyes for the Needy, a non-profit organization originally named, and still sometimes called, New Eyes

See also
 Ojos nuevos (New Eyes), 1970–72 science program broadcast by TVE
 "Nuevos Ojos", song by Pistolera